Misterios metro station is a Mexico City Metro station within the limits of Cuauhtémoc and Gustavo A. Madero, in Mexico City. Misterios station serves the colonias (neighborhoods) of Peralvillo and Vallejo.

The station receives its name from the Calzada de los Misterios, an avenue in Mexico City with many hermitages that reference the Mysteries of the Rosary; the station's pictogram features one of those hermitages. Misterios metro station was opened on  1982, on the first day of the La Raza–Pantitlán service. In 2019, the station had an average daily ridership of 8,092 passengers, making it the 164th busiest station in the network and the seventh busiest of the line.

Location
Misterios is a metro station located along Río Consulado Avenue, in northern Mexico City. The station serves the colonias (Mexican Spanish for "neighborhoods") of Peralvillo, in Cuauhtémoc, and Vallejo, in Gustavo A. Madero. Within the system, the station lies between La Raza and Valle Gómez stations.

The area is serviced by Line 7 of the Metrobús system at Misterios bus station, a few blocks away; by Line 4 (formerly Line G) of the trolleybus system, by Route 20-A of the city's public bus system, and by Route 200 of the Red de Transporte de Pasajeros network.

Exits
There are two exists:
North: Río Consulado Norte Avenue and Constantino Street, Vallejo, Gustavo A. Madero.
South: Río Consulado Sur Avenue and Constantino Street, Peralvillo, Cuauhtémoc.

History and construction
 of the Mexico City Metro was built by Cometro, a subsidiary of Empresas ICA. During the early excavations, a road that connected Tenochtitlan with the Tepeyac hill was found in the Valle Gómez–Misterios stretch. The road was built with materials dated from the Mesoamerican Postclassic Period. Misterios is an underground station that was opened on  1982, on the first day of the La Raza–Pantitlán service.

The station is named after the nearby , an avenue in Mexico City that connects the Basilica of Our Lady of Guadalupe with the Paseo de la Reforma Avenue. Calzada de los Misterios has 15 hermitages along it. These were built in the 17th century and they reference and illustrate the Mysteries of the Rosary; the station's pictogram represents one of those hermitages.

Originally, Line 8 (which runs from downtown Mexico City to Constitución de 1917 station in Iztapalapa) was planned to run from Pantitlán to Indios Verdes station, in northern Mexico City. The project was canceled due to the potential structural issues it would have caused near the Zócalo zone as it was planned to interchange with Line 2 at Zócalo station. The project of Line 8 was later modified to run from Indios Verdes to Constitución de 1917 station, with a transfer stop at Misterios station. However, its construction did not go beyond Garibaldi / Lagunilla metro station, its provisional terminal since 1994.

Incidents
A train's railway coupler broke on 21 April 2020 near the station. From 23 April to 15 June 2020, the station was temporarily closed due to the COVID-19 pandemic in Mexico. In the Misterios–Valle Gómez tunnel, a train window was ejected and caused a short circuit on 21 February 2021.

Ridership
According to the data provided by the authorities since the 2000s, commuters have averaged per year between 4,000 and 10,100 daily entrances in the last decade. In 2019, before the impact of the COVID-19 pandemic on public transport, the station's ridership totaled 2,953,802 passengers, which was a decrease of 107,804 passengers compared to 2018. In the same year, Misterios metro station was the 164th busiest of the system's 195 stations, and it was the line's 7th busiest.

Gallery

Notes

References

External links

1982 establishments in Mexico
Mexico City Metro Line 5 stations
Mexico City Metro stations in Cuauhtémoc, Mexico City
Mexico City Metro stations in Gustavo A. Madero, Mexico City
Railway stations located underground in Mexico
Railway stations opened in 1982